Honopū Valley is a landmark valley within Nā Pali Coast State Park along the northwest shore of Kauai, Hawaii, United States. At the lower end of the valley is Honopū's secluded,  beach, also known as Cathedral Beach.

Honopū means "conch shell", and the valley's name is derived from the conch shell-like sound its arch makes when hit by winds from the north.

History
Honopū Valley and Beach sit along the northwest shore of the Hawaiian island of Kauai, on the Na Pali coast. The valley is isolated and not easily accessible except by water. No landing of any aircraft or boat is allowed in Honopū Valley or on its beach, so visitors must swim from an offshore boat or from neighboring Kalalau Beach.

The valley, because of the mystery surrounding the exodus of the people who lived there until the mid-19th century, is sometimes called "the valley of the lost tribe." In 1922, visiting archaeologists found several skulls thought to be primitive, pre-Hawaiian people. Later studies of the valley and its artifacts determined all of its residents were clearly Hawaiian, but the erroneous legend endures.

As the valley is so hidden and isolated, it is believed to be spiritual: it is a place of temples and burial grounds, and the source of many Hawaiian legends and myths. The burial site for the local chiefs was located on the surrounding cliffs. It was believed that once a chief died, his bones held a supernatural power, and if found by others they could be used against the chief's tribe.  When chiefs died, their bones were collected and taken to the cliffs, and the warrior who transported the bones had to die in order to ensure the secrecy of the location of the bones.

In 1983 3 people from a sailboat while climbing up the arch discovered a skeleton while exploring the valley that led to the source of waterfall that fell on the beach. A skull and vertebrae were eroding out of the soil and the vertebrae were rolling down the incline from the steep location. Many unfortunate actions occurred after this exploration, including the close call of the sailboat being blown onto the rocks that the 3 explorers had anchored on Honopu Bay.

The land on Honopū Valley is highly fertile; a castaway could survive there simply on the large amount of wild fruit, such as guavas and grapefruit, that grows along its coast.

Menehune 

The only available information about the ancient mythological Menehune people of Polynesia comes from the stories told by natives. Native Hawaiians refer to the Menehune as being the “kamaaina”, or "children of the land". While they may simply be mythical, the Menehune are said to have lived throughout the Hawaiian Islands, including Kauai, which they inhabited in large numbers. The Honopu Valley is also known as "the valley of the lost tribe" because it was the home of the last Menehune.

Travel 
Honopū Ridge, above the cliffs, can be visited with a few miles' walk. The view along the way includes that of the ocean and the beach of Honopū.  There are tour boats that travel along the coast and helicopters offering aerial views of the valley. The Kalalau Trail ends near Honopū Valley.

Honopū Valley in film 

Aircraft and boats that are part of Hollywood film productions are the only ones allowed in Honopū Valley. Honopū Valley is perhaps most famous for its appearances in the 1976 remake of King Kong and in the 1998 movie Six Days Seven Nights.

In the 1976 remake of King Kong the beaches and jungles of Kauai, Hawaii stood in for South Pacific.  Originally only the jungle scenes were to be shot in Hawaii and the rest on Zuma Beach, California. Producer Dino De Laurentiis, however, was so pleased with Hawaii that he decided to film all the beach scenes at Honopū and Kalalau Valley. The producers and production crew of King Kong were told that Honopū Valley was uninhabited, but on the day that they arrived to start filming, they were shocked to find honeymooners on the beach. Scenes that involved filming in the ocean were hard to film due to the 12-foot-high waves. Most of the crew got seasick and one filming boat almost capsized. Examples of involved scenes are when the party arrive on Skull Island and the nighttime arrival to rescue Dwan; other scenes are the arrival of equipment to capture King Kong and Fred Wilson directing the rescue mission.

For the film Six Days Seven Nights, Hawaii stood in for French Polynesia. Among the scenes filmed on Honopū Beach is the one in which Harrison Ford runs from pirates. The arch is also included in the film.

Other Hollywood movies filmed in Honopū Valley include Honeymoon in Vegas, Acapulco Gold, and Raiders of the Lost Ark.
More recently the beach and surrounding scenery were used as location for the fourth in the Pirates of the Caribbean series of movies, On Stranger Tides (2011).

References

External links
Kauai-Hawaii.com

Valleys of Kauai
Tourist attractions in Kauai County, Hawaii